Tony Kehrer (born January 16, 1937) was a Canadian football player who played for the Winnipeg Blue Bombers and Edmonton Eskimos. He won the Grey Cup with Winnipeg in 1958 and 1959. He played junior football for the Rods and won two championships in 1956 in Winnipeg and 1957 in Toronto.

References

1937 births
Living people
Edmonton Elks players
Winnipeg Blue Bombers players